Göktürk Gökalp Ural (born May 31, 1995) is a Turkish professional basketball player who plays for Galatasaray Liv Hospital of the Turkish Basketball League.

Professional career
Göktürk grew up with the youth team of Galatasaray Istanbul. And was added to the training camp of the team before the start of the season 2014-15.

Early years
Göktürk has been a member of the Turkish U-16 and U-20 National Team.

In the season 2013-14 Göktürk served as the captain of the youth team of Galatasaray, leading his team to the championship in the Istanbul League and 3rd place in the National League.

During the National League he averaged 15 points, 6.6 rebounds and 7.1 assists per game. And was selected 'Forward of the Tournament', while also leading the league in assists.

External links
 Göktürk Gökalp Ural at euroleague.net
 Göktürk Gökalp Ural at fiba.com
 Göktürk Gökalp Ural at galatasaray.org
 Göktürk Gökalp Ural at tblstat.net

1995 births
Living people
Galatasaray S.K. (men's basketball) players
Shooting guards
Small forwards
Turkish men's basketball players